Xylota meigeniana is a species of hoverfly in the family Syrphidae.

Distribution
Russia, Ukraine.

References

Eristalinae
Insects described in 1964
Diptera of Europe
Taxa named by Aleksandr Stackelberg